The Austrian Footballer of the Year award is an annual football award, established in Austria in 1984 and sponsored by the Austria Press Agency (APA). The coaches of all Austrian Football Bundesliga clubs vote to elect the player of the year. Eligible for selection are all players playing in the Austrian league, as well as any Austrian player playing abroad. The winners for the preceding year are usually announced in January.

List of winners

Multiple winners
Players in bold are still active.

See also
 Austrian Sportspersonality of the year

References
 RSSSF

Footballers in Austria
Awards established in 1984
1984 establishments in Austria
Austrian awards
Annual events in Austria
Association football player non-biographical articles
Association football player of the year awards by nationality